The Paleface River is a  tributary of the Whiteface River in Saint Louis County, Minnesota, United States. The banks are heavily wooded with old birch and pine trees.

See also
List of rivers of Minnesota

References

External links
Minnesota Watersheds
USGS Hydrologic Unit Map – State of Minnesota (1974)

Rivers of Minnesota
Tributaries of Lake Superior
Rivers of St. Louis County, Minnesota